Baltasar de Figueroa, O. Cist. (1634–1684) was a Roman Catholic prelate who served as Bishop of Santiago de Cuba (1683–1684).

Biography
Baltasar de Figueroa was born in Jaén, Spain on 29 Dec 1634 and ordained a priest in the Cistercian Order.
On 10 May 1683, he was appointed during the papacy of Pope Innocent XI as Bishop of Santiago de Cuba.
He served as Bishop of Santiago de Cuba until his death on 8 Sep 1684.

References

External links and additional sources
 (for Chronology of Bishops)  
 (for Chronology of Bishops) 

17th-century Roman Catholic bishops in Cuba
Bishops appointed by Pope Innocent XI
1634 births
1684 deaths
Cistercian bishops
Roman Catholic bishops of Santiago de Cuba